Frank Paul Simoneaux (born October 30, 1933) is a lawyer in Baton Rouge, Louisiana, who served as a Democrat from 1972 to 1982 in the Louisiana House of Representatives. From 1980 to 1982, Simoneaux was the House Speaker Pro Tem. He resigned from the House with more than a year remaining in his third term.

Simoneaux is a Phi Delta Phi honor graduate of the Louisiana State University Law Center in Baton Rouge.

In the first administration of Governor Bobby Jindal, Simoneaux served as chairman of the Louisiana Ethics Commission. Simoneaux was listed in December 2014 by the office of Louisiana Secretary of State Tom Schedler as an Independent voter.

References

1933 births
Living people
Louisiana lawyers
Democratic Party members of the Louisiana House of Representatives
Politicians from Baton Rouge, Louisiana
Louisiana State University Law Center alumni